The 2018–19 season was Al-Nassr's 43rd consecutive season in the top flight of Saudi football and 63rd year in existence as a football club. Along with the Pro League, the club competed in the King Cup, Arab Club Champions Cup, and the Champions League. The season covers the period from 1 July 2018 to 30 June 2019.

Al-Nassr won their eighth Pro League title on 16 May 2019 following a 2–1 home win over Al-Batin.

Players

Squad information

Transfers

In

Loans in

Out

Loans out

Pre-season and friendlies

Competitions

Overview

Goalscorers

Last Updated: 16 May 2019

Assists

Last Updated: 16 May 2019

Clean sheets

Last Updated: 29 May 2019

Notes

References

Al Nassr FC seasons
Nassr